Sir Edward Chandos Leigh  (22 December 1832 – 18 May 1915) was a British aristocrat of the Victorian era, a barrister by profession, and a first-class cricketer. He served as President of MCC for 1887–88.

Background
Born at Stoneleigh Abbey, Warwickshire, he was the second son of Chandos, 1st Baron Leigh and Margarette Willes, daughter of the Reverend William Shippen Willes, of Astrop House, Northamptonshire.

Leigh attended Harrow School before going up to Oriel College, Oxford, where he was elected a Fellow of All Souls.

Cricket career
Leigh started playing cricket as a boy at Stoneleigh Abbey after his father Lord Leigh, Lord Byron's schoolmate at Harrow, established a cricket ground at his country estate at Stoneleigh Abbey in 1839 for his eldest son William Henry Leigh who was attending Harrow. In 1847 Leigh started at Harrow and was quickly identified by Bob Grimston as a future cricketer to the Harrow XI captain Henry Vernon "There, Vernon, is the young cricketer". Bob Grimston and Frederick Ponsonby were to become his lifelong friends. On 15 June 1847 his home club side Stoneleigh Club including his elder brother William Henry Leigh, Lord Burghley, Lord Guernsey and Robert Grimston played against the Harrow XI. In September 1848 Edward played for the 22 of Leamington & District v the All England XI at Wisden & Parr's Ground, Leamington. In 1849 and 1850 he was selected for the Harrow XI and in 1851 he captained the Harrow XI and scored the highest score of 42 in Harrow's win v Eton at Lords.

At Oxford in 1852 he obtained his Blue as a freshman and played against Cambridge at Lord's in 1852, 1853 and 1854 as captain. Oxford won all three matches although Eddy (as he was known) made only 8 runs in total during these matches. Shrimp Leveson Gower records in his Recollections of Oxford cricket an incident forty years later when he had scored 73 runs in Oxford's first innings. 'On my return to the pavilion my Uncle – Edward Chandos Leigh, who was seated near the entrance gate, greeted me with the words: "Well Done, Schwimp (he could not pronounce his R's) "Capital, capital, you played just like I used to".  His nephew replied 'Heaven forbid, Uncle Eddy'.

Leigh was a founder of the Oxford Harlequins Club. He was a Fellow of All Souls until 1871 and played for Oxfordshire County XI and the Gentleman of MCC. He played regularly for I Zingari for 20 years until 1874. Scores & Biographies records he was a right-handed batsman, steady and sure, but fields with his left. His highest first-class score was 62 playing for the MCC v Kent at Canterbury in 1861. At the same festival fielding at his customary position of long-stop his left hand was broken badly by a ball bowled by Harvey Fellows who was apparently showing off to the ladies on Ladies' Day.
Sir Pelham Warner records 'according to Sir Edward, Harvey was 'showing off before the ladies on Ladies' Day by endeavouring to bowl faster than ever. Poor Chandos Leigh had a bad time at long-stop and when he returned home after match, battered and bruised, his man said to him ' I beg your pardon, sir, but have you noticed your finger? Finger? Which finger? This one, sir, it's broken' Good heavens, man! Quick! Get me an arnica bath. And that was why in after-years Sir Edward often shook with half a hand'.

He served as Secretary of I Zingari for many years and later Chancellor. He regularly captained I Zingari on their tours of Ireland during the 1850s and 1860s. He captained I Zingari on their and the MCC's tour in 1867 to the Paris Exhibition. It was said if I Zingari had "the four Edwards" it was sure to do well; Edward Tredcroft, Edward Balfour, Edward Drake and Edward Chandos Leigh. In his autobiography Bar, Bat and Bit, published in 1913, Leigh records the enjoyment of playing for I Zingari at the Canterbury Festival and touring England and Ireland's country estates. He met his future wife at Croxteth Hall while performing for the Old Stagers as a guest of Lord Sefton with I Zingari. He was a close friend and brother-in-law of Robert A Fitzgerald - MCC secretary – and in his 1887 centenary speech lamented the recent loss to the MCC and cricket of the genial and witty Bob Fitz-gerald.

In 1871 Leigh married Katherine Fanny Rigby having sought permission from John Lorraine Baldwin at I Zingari. In 1872 he played his last game for I Zingari v Gentleman of Warwickshire at Stoneleigh Abbey to celebrate his nephew's 21st 'coming of age' celebrations. It was fitting he returned to the place he had started his cricket career 30 years earlier. He joined the MCC in 1852 and served on its committee 1866–69, 1877–79, 1888–1891. He was elected president in 1887 having been nominated by Lord Lyttleton. He never forgot his alma mater – Harrow School – and helped establish the Old Harrovians Field House Club in 1884. He was President of the Club following his close friend the Earl of Bessborough.

Leigh's cricketing career and first-class stats might be considered average but he was a popular choice as President of the Marylebone Cricket Club (MCC) in its first centenary year in 1887 and the Golden Jubilee year of Queen Victoria. At the centenary MCC dinner at the old Tennis Court it was said of him his speech that night rivaled Leighton at the Royal Academy. "I will say that the old cricketer stood up bravely in bumpy grounds in spite of awkward knocks and ugly bruises." Wisden acknowledged him as an excellent "long-stop" who "will let a ball go through him rather than by him" and his style of batting was awkward, but he is a fine hitter forward and to leg. It was said of Leigh in his maturer years by one who had played many matches with him when he was captain of I Zingari teams, that if ever there was a man to pull a match out of the fire by his management, he was that man. The same principle which he carried out on hunting when he came to a big fence, "throw your heart over and the body will follow" was his rule with the bat – he would not be beat.

"The man himself was more entertaining than the printed page. To sit beside him in the pavilion at Lords' or in the Old Stagers enclosure at Canterbury was to see cricket as it was played in the golden days". At Lord's he was always to be seen on match days at the 'Knatchbull's corner - the place of the Four-in-Hand Club – with his friends John Lorraine Baldwin, Sir Spencer Ponsonby Fane, Earl of Bessborough and Robert Grimston.' The famous old cricketer, with his hat drawn over his eyes, and his burly physique set a figure that always arrested attention.

Professional and public career
In 1890 Leigh was founder member of the London Playing Fields Society, which successfully secured land in London for cricket and football to be played for London's citizens. He was Recorder of Nottingham from 1881 to 1909 and Counsel to the Speaker of the Commons from 1883 to 1907. He was appointed a Commander of the Order of the Bath (CB) in the 1895 Resignation Honours, and a Knight Commander of the Order of the Bath (KCB) in the 1901 New Year Honours.

He was a regular visitor to Lord's, The Canterbury and Scarborough Festivals up until his death in May 1915. He died just six days after his youngest son Edward was killed in action at Aubers Ridge. His elder son Major Chandos Leigh was the first Harrovian to be killed in the Great War, at Mons in August 1914, and the second blow was too much for him. He died, in the same year as W. G. Grace and his good friend Sir Spencer Ponsonby-Fane, of a broken heart mourning the loss of his two sons and the end of the golden age of cricket.

Notes

External links
 Stoneleigh Cricket Club
 Edward Chandos Leigh - More Information and Photos
 

1832 births
1915 deaths
People educated at Harrow School
Alumni of Oriel College, Oxford
English cricketers
Oxford University cricketers
Marylebone Cricket Club cricketers
Presidents of the Marylebone Cricket Club
Younger sons of barons
Gentlemen of England cricketers
Knights Commander of the Order of the Bath
Gentlemen of Marylebone Cricket Club cricketers